Berk is both a surname and a given name. Notable people with the name include:

Surname
Ailsa Berk, British actress and choreographer
Ari Berk (born 1967), American writer, artist, and scholar
Ariel Berk, a pen name of American author Judith Arnold (born 1953)
Brent Berk (born 1949), American former competition swimmer
Dick Berk (born 1939), American musician
Henrietta Berk (1919–1990), American painter
İlhan Berk (1918–2008), Turkish poet
John van den Berk (born 1967), Dutch motorcyclist
Josh Berk, American author
Lawrence Berk (1908–1995), American founder of the Berklee College of Music, pianist, composer, and educator
Lee Eliot Berk (born 1942), American former president of the Berklee College of Music, son of Lawrence
Lotte Berk (1913–2003), German-British dancer and dance teacher
Lucia de Berk (born 1961), Dutch nurse wrongfully convicted of murder
Michael Berk (fl. 1980s–2010s), American screenwriter
Nick Berk (born 1980), American professional wrestler also known by his ring name, Nicky Benz
Sammy Berk (1894–1983), American vaudeville entertainer 
Sander Berk (born 1979), Dutch triathlete
Sheryl Berk (fl. 2000s–2010s), American writer
Steven N. Berk, a judge on the Superior Court of the District of Columbia
Suat Berk (1901–2002), Turkish judge

Given name
Berk Akalın (born 1995), Turkish ice dancer
Berk Neziroğluları (born 1991), Turkish footballer

In fiction
Berk, character in the television series The Trap Door

See also
 Berks (disambiguation), includes list of people with name Berks
 Birk (name)
 Burk (name)
 Burke (surname)
 Birks (surname)

Turkish-language surnames
Turkish masculine given names
Toponymic surnames
Surnames from given names
nl:Berk